The  is a railway line operated by the private railway operator Hanshin Electric Railway connecting Amagasaki Station in Amagasaki, Hyogo Prefecture, and Ōsaka Namba Station in Chuo-ku, Osaka, Osaka Prefecture, Japan.

History 

The , the predecessor of the Hanshin Namba Line, was planned as a bypass for the Hanshin Railway Main Line, and to connect from Amagasaki to Noda via Dempō. Then the plan was changed to connect to Nishikujō. The line was finally extended to Namba station in 2009.

January 20, 1924 - The Dempō Line was opened (Daimotsu - Dempō).
August 1, 1924 - The line was extended from Dempō to Chidoribashi.
December 28, 1928 - The line was extended from Daimotsu to Amagasaki.
June 1960 - The first stage of construction to extend line to Namba was started (Chidoribashi - Nishikujō).
May 20, 1964 - The first stage of construction to extend the line to Namba was completed, thus, the line was extended from Chidoribashi to Nishikujō.
September 1965 - Nishi-Osaka limited express service started.
December 1, 1974 - Nishi-Osaka limited express service was abandoned.
July 10, 2001 - Nishi-Osaka Railway Co., Ltd. was established to restart the extension from Nishikujō to Namba.
October 7, 2003 - The construction of the extending line from Nishikujō to Namba was restarted.
March 20, 2009 - The line from Nishikujō to Namba opened, and the line was renamed the Hanshin Namba Line.

Operations 
There are through rapid express operations between Kobe Sannomiya on the Main Line in Kobe and Kintetsu Nara Station on the Kintetsu Nara Line in Nara via the Hanshin Namba Line, and through local, semi-express, and suburban semi-express operations between Amagasaki Station and Kintetsu Nara Station.

Rapid Express
Three to five trains per hour on weekdays, and three trains per hour at weekends and holidays
Trains stop at Kobe Sannomiya, Uozaki, Ashiya, Nishinomiya, Koshien, Amagasaki, Nishikujo, Kujo, Dome-mae, Sakuragawa, Ōsaka Namba, Kintetsu Nippombashi, Osaka Uehommachi, Tsuruhashi, Ikoma, Gakuen-mae, Yamato-Saidaiji, Shin-Omiya and Kintetsu Nara. Rapid express services also stop at Imazu and Mukogawa during the weekday offpeak, and on weekends and holidays, but pass Ashiya on weekends and holidays.
The first 3 trains are operated from Shinkaichi Station on the Kobe Kosoku Line for Nara at weekends and holidays.
6, 8 or 10 cars (Weekdays: 6 cars between Kobe Sannomiya and Amagasaki / weekends and holidays: many trains have 8 cars between Kobe Sannomiya and Kintetsu Nara)
Local, semi-express, suburban semi-express
6 trains per hour every day
Local trains stop at every station on the Hanshin Namba Line, the Kintetsu Namba Line, and the Kitntetsu Nara Line.
Semi-express trains stop at every station between Amagasaki and Tsuruhashi, Fuse, Kawachi-Kosaka, Higashi-Hanazono, and every station between Ishikiri and Kintetsu Nara. Suburban semi-express trains also stop at Hyotan-yama, Hiraoka and Nukata.
6 cars

Stations 
● : trains stop
| : trains pass
Local / Suburban semi-express / Semi-express trains stop at every station on this line

Rolling stock
 Hanshin 1000 series EMU
 Hanshin 9000 series EMU
 Kintetsu 1026 series EMU
 Kintetsu 1252 series EMU
 Kintetsu 5800 series EMU
 Kintetsu 5820 series EMU
 Kintetsu 9020 series EMU
 Kintetsu 9820 series EMU
 Kintetsu 22600 series EMU (chartered trains)

References 

Lines of Hanshin Electric Railway
Rail transport in Osaka Prefecture
Rail transport in Hyōgo Prefecture
Standard gauge railways in Japan
Railway lines opened in 1924